Bahamians  are people originating or having roots from The Commonwealth of The Bahamas. One can also become a Bahamian by acquiring citizenship.

History

Culture

Olympic Games

World Championships in Athletics

List

 Sidney Poitier, first black man to win an Oscar, first black American actor to win Best Actor, first black American actor to be nominated for best actor.
 Shaunae Miller-Uibo, sprinter, 2016 Olympic 400m champion, and world record holder in 200m straight
 Buddy Hield, basketball player
 Klay Thompson, basketball player
 Rick Fox, three-time NBA champion, owner of Echo Fox
 Lynden Oscar Pindling, first Prime Minister of the Bahamas.
 Joseph Robert Love, important pan-African leader of the 19th and 20th century who influenced Marcus Garvey
 Allan Glaisyer Minns, first black British mayor
 Bert Williams, first black lead actor on Broadway
 Deandre Ayton, was ranked number-one high-school basketball player in the USA by scout in 2015
 Mychal Thompson, two-time NBA champion and first foreign-born player to be selected as 1st pick in the NBA draft history.
 Angela Palacious, first woman deacon and priest of the Diocese of The Bahamas and the Turks and Caicos Islands
 Yves Edwards, mixed martial artist
 Kimbo Slice, streetfighter, boxer and mixed martial artist

Gallery

See also
 Demographics of the Bahamas
 Bahamian Americans

References

External links

 
Society of the Bahamas